Vũ Văn Danh (born 17 April 1926) is a Vietnamese former sports shooter. He competed in the 25 metre pistol event at the 1968 Summer Olympics and placed 53rd. He was a police colonel and was married to a fellow Olympics shooter Hương Hoàng Thi.

References

External links
 

1926 births
Possibly living people
Vietnamese male sport shooters
Olympic shooters of Vietnam
Shooters at the 1968 Summer Olympics
Sportspeople from Hanoi
20th-century Vietnamese people